Hemus is a genus of spider crab in the family Majidae. It contains four species:
 Hemus analogus Rathbun, 1898
 Hemus cristulipes A. Milne-Edwards, 1875
 Hemus finneganae Garth, 1958
 Hemus magalae Windsor & Felder, 2011

References

Majoidea